"Down to London" is a song by British singer-songwriter and musician Joe Jackson, which was released in 1989 as the second single from his eighth studio album Blaze of Glory. The song was written and produced by Jackson.

Background
"Down to London" is one of a number of tracks from Blaze of Glory to be autobiographical. The song was inspired by the early days of Jackson's music career in London. In an interview on VH1's New Visions in 1989, Jackson commented,

Promotion
The song's music video was directed by Julien Temple and produced by Amanda Temple for Limelight. During July 1989, Jackson and his band performed the song on The Arsenio Hall Show and Jackson also performed a solo piano version on VH1 New Visions.

Critical reception
On its release as a single, David Giles of Music Week described "Down to London" as "a fine tribute to a 'rusty old town'." He noted how the production "has kept everything nice and simple, even leaving in some very hesitant entries by co-vocalist Joy Askew". He also praised Jackson for having "retained his bite and inventiveness where most of his contemporaries have blanded out". Andrew Hirst of the Huddersfield Daily Examiner wrote, "The harmonica interludes and spluttering brass almost save this song about the lure of London's bright lights from oblivion. Just don't try busking with it, Joe."

In a review of Blaze of Glory, Robin Denselow of The Guardian considered the album to be "inevitably patchy" but picked "Down to London" as one of its "moments". He described the song as "Sixties-style" which "echoes Buffalo Springfield's 'For What It's Worth'." David Okamoto, writing for the St. Petersburg Times commented: "...only the snappy 'Down to London' - which borrows its piano line from Marvin Gaye's 'I Heard It Through the Grapevine' - manages to strike a nostalgic chord."

Kristin Faurest of The Courier-Journal felt "Down to London" was the album's "most irresistible number by far". He added: "[It] shuffles and scratches along to the tune of a wailing harmonica and the kind of melody that makes you thump your hand against the steering wheel in time." Peter B. King, writing for the Scripps Howard News Service, described the song as a "melodic rocker about the lure of the big city".

People singled "Down to London" as the "best tune" which "boasts bouncy piano chords and lyrics about making it as a rock star". In a retrospective review of the album, Stephen Thomas Erlewine of AllMusic praised "Down to London" as a "brisk, stylish pop song". In 2009, Glide Magazine ranked it as Jackson's 4th best song.

Track listing
7" and cassette single
"Down to London" – 4:15
"You Can't Get What You Want ('Til You Know What You Want)" (Live) – 5:32

CD single
"Down to London" - 4:40
"You Can't Get What You Want ('Til You Know What You Want)" (Live) – 5:49
"Sunday Papers" (Live) – 5:12

CD single (US promo)
"Down to London" (LP Version) – 4:15

Personnel
Down to London
 Joe Jackson – vocals, piano, fake harmonica
 Joy Askew – vocals
 Tom Teeley – guitar
 Chris Hunter – alto saxophone
 Tony Aiello – tenor saxophone
 Steve Elson – baritone saxophone
 Michael Morreale, Tony Barrero – trumpet
 Charles Gordon – trombone
 Graham Maby – bass
 Gary Burke – drums

Production
 Joe Jackson – producer, arranger
 Ed Roynesdal – associate producer and programming on "Down to London"
 David Kershenbaum, Joe Jackson – producers of "You Can't Get What You Want" and "Sunday Papers"
 Joe Barbaria – engineer
 Thom Cadley – assistant engineer
 Bridget Daly – mixing assistant
 Bob Ludwig – mastering

Other
 Stylorouge – design

Charts

References

1989 singles
1989 songs
Joe Jackson (musician) songs
Songs written by Joe Jackson (musician)
A&M Records singles
Songs about London